Kim Gyu-ri may refer to:
 Kim Gyu-ri (actress, born June 1979)
 Kim Gyu-ri (actress, born August 1979)